is a former Japanese football player and current assistant manager of J2 league team Oita Trinita.

Playing career
Iwase was born in Gunma Prefecture on July 8, 1975. After graduating from high school, he joined Urawa Red Diamonds in 1994. he debuted in 1995 and he played many matches in 1996. However he could hardly play in the match from 1997. In September 1998, he moved to Japan Football League club Omiya Ardija. He became a regular player immediately and the club was promoted to J2 League from 1999. However his opportunity to play decreased from 2000 and he retired end of 2002 season.

Coaching career
After retirement, Iwase started coaching career at Urawa Red Diamonds from 2005. He mainly coached youth team until 2012. In 2013, he moved to Kashiwa Reysol and coached youth team. In 2017, he became a coach for top team. In November 2018, he became a manager as Nozomu Kato successor and Iwase managed last 2 matches in 2018 season. Although Reysol won the 2 matches, the club finished at the 17 place of 18 clubs and was relegated to J2 League. He also resigned end of 2018 season.
In December 2020, he was appointed as head coach of Omiya Ardija

Club statistics

Managerial statistics

References

External links

1975 births
Living people
Association football people from Gunma Prefecture
Japanese footballers
J1 League players
J2 League players
Japan Football League (1992–1998) players
Urawa Red Diamonds players
Omiya Ardija players
Japanese football managers
J1 League managers
J2 League managers
Kashiwa Reysol managers
Omiya Ardija managers
Association football midfielders